Rascals in Paradise was a comic book limited series created in 1994 by writer/artist Jim Silke and published by Dark Horse Comics. It was labeled "for mature adults only", and illustrated in a "deco sci-fi" style.

Plot
In the year 2362, a duplicate of Earth is created, ostensibly as a planet-sized vacation resort. However, due to an error or miscalculation, the machine intelligence that was supposed to create the world instead created a planet called Trash-9, a world covered by hostile jungles, wilderness and deserts, and populated by dangerous natives.

Collected editions
In 1995, the series was collected into a trade paperback by Dark Horse Comics.

Notes

References

 

1994 comics debuts